Richard Puller von Hohenburg (d. 24 September 1482) was a 15th-century Alsatian and Swiss nobleman and knight. He is notable for his homosexual liaisons, his strategic avoidance of prosecution, and later execution for his homosexuality.

Biography
Richard Puller von Hohenburg was born as the only son to the successful noble Konrad von Hohenburg, descendant of the 13th-century minstrel . He was a citizen of Strasbourg in Alsace, and married there.

In 1463, the Swiss noble Wirich von Berstett captured one of Puller's servants, a man named Ludwig Fischer, after he had been seen dressed in lavish clothes and with more money than his occupation would afford him. In early modern Europe, gifts of clothing were often used as evidence of offering improper sexual services, presented as either a token of love or a bribe from the paying participant. Under torture, Fischer revealed that Puller had romantically pursued him, an act he used to his advantage by blackmailing Puller for money and status. Puller was consequently stripped of his fiefs, which were transferred to the bishop of Strasbourg, Rupert of Palatinate-Simmern, but he was not put on trial. Shortly after, he was released from arrest.

Though he had managed to evade prosecution this time, in 1474 Puller was again accused of sodomy. Puller's enemies even claimed that, in the interval between these charges, Puller had been so wary of discovery he had a servant who witnessed a sexual act drowned. Even against such a severe charge, Puller managed to evade negative consequences through the strategic manipulation of his social status. He procured, or else forged, letters of recommendation from far-off authorities, playing the local Alsatian nobles off against the secular imperial powers of the Holy Roman Empire. By 1476, Puller was released upon a set of conditions: confessing his misdeeds, giving up his properties, and monastic imprisonment. Puller fled from Alsace soon after, stripped of his Alsatian possessions, but fled before beginning a monastic life, intent on recovering his possessions.

In 1476, Puller had turned to the Old Swiss Confederacy, then a popular refuge for European criminals, in search of aid in reclaiming his lost properties. He turned to city authorities at Bern for assistance, who rejected his pleas after much deliberation, and after that the authorities of Zürich, who were more obliging and accepted him. Despite this, Puller's property claims created some conflict between the Confederacy and the city of Strasbourg, who had historically been close allies to the Swiss. Puller's residence in Zürich became a political nuisance for the city, whose relations with Strasbourg and the other cities of the Confederacy were in jeopardy. In 1482, city officials discovered a homosexual relationship between Puller and his servant, Anton Mätzler. The convenient relief this trial provided to tensions between the Confederacy and Strasbourg was not uncommented on by contemporaries. Indeed one source (apparently from an underling of the councillors) alleges Strasbourg made a payment of eight thousand florins to the councillors for the trial and execution of Puller, although the source makes no bones about Puller's guilt of the charges.

Contemporary chronicler Diebold Schilling the Elder reported that, as before, this act had been discovered because of his servant's boasts of the "precious clothing, beautiful shirts, and other treasures" in his possession, which the officials had suspected to be sexual gifts from his master. Puller and his servant were charged by the officials with "heresy". Under torture by the city officials, Puller confessed to having had same-sex relationships with Mätzler and several other men. Consequently he was sentenced to be burned at the stake alongside his servant Mätzler in the market square of Zurich. On 24 September 1482, a large crowd had gathered to see Puller executed. Puller was asked to repeat his confession, but he refused, instead claiming that the accusation of sodomy was only a cover for the Zürich officials who wished to seize his land and fortune. One of the officials mentioned by name was Hans Waldmann, then mayor of Zurich, who was later executed for several charges (among them, sodomy) after a spectacular but brief and unpopular political career in Zurich. With the execution of its last scion, the noble family of the von Hohenburgs perished, with its name passing on to the Sickinger family.

References

Sources

Further reading
 
 
 
 
 

1454 births
1482 deaths
15th-century Swiss nobility
Alsatian nobility
LGBT nobility
Medieval LGBT people
People executed for sodomy
People prosecuted under anti-homosexuality laws
Violence against gay men